Whitworth Hospital is a healthcare facility on the Bakewell Road between Darley Dale and Matlock in Derbyshire, England. It is managed by Derbyshire Community Health Services NHS Foundation Trust.

History
The facility, which was founded by Lady Louisa Whitworth in memory of her husband Sir Joseph Whitworth, opened as the Whitworth Cottage Hospital in 1889. It briefly closed in 1897 and was re-opened by the Duchess of Devonshire as the "Endowed Whitworth General and Infectious Hospitals (gifts to Darley district)" in 1898. It joined the National Health Service as the Whitworth Hospital in 1948. In January 2019 it was announced that the rehabilitation ward at the hospital, which had faced closure, would be retained.

References

External links
Official site

Hospital buildings completed in 1889
Hospitals in Derbyshire
Hospitals established in 1889
1889 establishments in England
NHS hospitals in England